"Mutual Feeling" is the fifth single released by the British R&B recording artist Beverley Knight from her debut album The B-Funk (1995). The track, which peaked at #124 on the UK Singles Chart when it was released in 1996, did not have a promotional video made to accompany it and remains Knight's second lowest charting single to date in the UK, after "After You".

Track list
"Mutual Feeling" (Radio Version) 3:57
"Mutual Feeling" (featuring Blak Twang) (Remix)  4:53
"Mutual Feeling" (D-Lux Remix) 5:04
"Mutual Feeling" (Linslee Remix) 4:35
"Mutual Feeling" (featuring Blak Twang) (Minnx Remix)  5:10
"Mutual Feeling" (featuring Blak Twang) (Munroe Remix)  5:08

Charts

Personnel
Written by Beverley Knight, Tony Olabode and Victor Redwood-Sawyerr
Produced by Tony Olabode and Victor Redwood-Sawyerr
All vocals performed by Beverley Knight

See also
Beverley Knight discography

1996 singles
Beverley Knight songs
Songs written by Beverley Knight
Hip hop soul songs
1995 songs